was a Japanese film actress. She appeared in 20 films between 1967 and 1985.

Biography 
Kiwako Taichi was born in Tokyo on 2 December 1943. She graduated Shoin Junior and Senior High School and, after training in the Haiyuza Theatre Company, she joined Bungakuza in 1967. In 1970, she married actorTaisaku Akino but divorced.

She died in a car accident in Ito, Shizuoka on 13 October 1992 while working there with Bungakuza.

Partial filmography

Film 

 Kawa jean blues (1961)
 Beranme Chunori-san (1961)
 Akuma no temari-uta (1961) - Satoko Nire
 Minyo no tabi: Sakurajima Otemoyan (1962)
 Tekka wakashu (1962)
 Hibari no Hahakoi Guitar (1962)
 Hana o kuu mushi (1967) - Nami Aoki
 Kuroneko (1968) - Shige (Daughter-in-Law)
 Dankon (1969) - Saori
 Hitorikko (1969)
 The Scandalous Adventures of Buraikan (1970) - Namiji
 Shokkaku (1970) - Yae
 Yakuza Zessyō (1970) - Kanae
 Live Today, Die Tomorrow! (1970) - Friend
 If You Were Young: Rage (1970)
 Konto Gojugo-vai para Miko no zettai zetsumei (1971) - Momoyo Tashiro
 Kaoyaku (1971) - Mayumi Takigawa
 Ningen Hyoteki (1971)
 Kokuhakuteki joyûron (1971) - Rie
 Zatoichi in Desperation (1972) - Nishikigi
 Akumyo: shima arashi (1974) - Oteru
 The Last Samurai (1974) - Ohide
 Kigeki-otoko no ude dameshi (1974)
 Kigeki: onna no naki-dokoro (1975)
 Cross the Rubicon! (1975) - Shizuko
 Tora-san's Sunrise and Sunset (1976) - Botan
 Gokumon-to (1977) - Tomoe Kitô - Gihei's Wife
 Shinjuku baka monogatari (1977)
 Kôtei no inai hachigatsu (1978) - Ayako Nakagami
 Fire Festival (1985) - Kimiko
 Chichi (1988)

Television 
 Kunitori Monogatari (1973) - Nene
 Zatoichi Series: The Kannon Statue That was Bound (縛られ観音ゆきずり旅, 1974)

References

Citations

Works cited

External links

1943 births
1992 deaths
Japanese film actresses
Road incident deaths in Japan
People from Tokyo
20th-century Japanese actresses